The Fighting Shepherdess is a 1920 American western-romance film directed by Edward José and Millard Webb and written by Frank Mitchell Dazey. It is based on the 1919 novel The Fighting Shepherdess by Caroline Lockhart. The film stars Anita Stewart, Wallace MacDonald, Noah Beery Sr., Walter Long, Eugenie Besserer and John Hall. The film was released on March 1, 1920, by First National Exhibitors' Circuit.

Cast       
Anita Stewart as Kate Prentice
Wallace MacDonald as Hughie
Noah Beery Sr. as Mormon Joe
Walter Long as Pete Mullendore
Eugenie Besserer as Jezebel
John Hall as Tetters
Gibson Gowland as Bowers
Calvert Carter as Mayor
Billie DeVail as Banker
Maude Wayne as Beth
Ben Lewis as Lingle
Will Jeffries as The Engineer

References

External links
 

1920 films
American romance films
1920s romance films
First National Pictures films
Films directed by Edward José
Films directed by Millard Webb
American silent feature films
American black-and-white films
1920s English-language films
1920s American films
Silent American Western (genre) films
1920 Western (genre) films